Purnmasi Ram (born 5 January 1950) is an Indian politician. He was elected to Bihar Legislative Assembly consecutively five times from 1990. In 2009, he was elected a member of parliament to the 15th Lok Sabha.

In November 2019, he joined forces with IAS officer Gulrez Hoda to launch a new political party Jan Sangharsh Dal, which seeks to represent Dalits and Muslims in Bihar.

Early life
Ram was born on 5 January 1950 to father Mohar Ram and mother Chinegee Devi in Naraipur village, in West Champaran district in the Indian state of Bihar. Ram attended Vidyapeeth school in Deoghar, Jharkhand, and completed matriculation from the school.

Career
Ram was elected to Bihar Vidhan Sabha five times in a row, first in 1990. During his first term, 1990–1995, he was a Minister of State, and a Cabinet Minister for  terms from 1995 to 2005 and 2005 to 2009, as a Chairman of Committee on Welfare of Scheduled Castes and Scheduled Tribes. In 2009, he was elected a member of parliament and was a member of the Committee on Food, Consumer Affairs and Public Distribution.

Personal life
Ram married Kanti Devi on 1 January 1968. They have two sons named Ajay and Vijay and four daughters.

References

1950 births
Living people
India MPs 2009–2014
Lok Sabha members from Bihar
Candidates in the 2014 Indian general election
United Progressive Alliance candidates in the 2014 Indian general election
Bihar MLAs 1990–1995
Bihar MLAs 1995–2000
Bihar MLAs 2000–2005
Bihar MLAs 2005–2010
Janata Dal (United) politicians
State cabinet ministers of Bihar
Indian National Congress politicians